Augustin de Boschenry de Drucour or de Drucourt (signed Chevalier de Drucour, baptized March 27, 1703—August 28, 1762) was a French military officer, who led the French defence in the Siege of Louisbourg.

He was a son of Jean-Louis de Boschenry, Baron de Drucourt and Marie-Louise Godard. Drucour joined the French Navy in 1719 as a midshipman in Toulon.

In October 1746, while aboard the Mars, a French naval vessel which was returning to France as part of the failed Duc d'Anville Expedition, he was taken prisoner by the British, and imprisoned for a year before returning to France.

He became a ship captain in 1751. In 1754, he was appointed Governor of Île Royale. During his career he made 16 major voyages to such places as Copenhagen, Stockholm, Martinique and Saint-Domingue.

References

External links
 Letter of Governor Drucour to a friend written at Andover, October 1758

French Navy officers
1703 births
1762 deaths
French people of the French and Indian War